The Old Surrey, Burstow and West Kent Hunt is a United Kingdom foxhound pack, with hunting country covering around 42 miles East to West and 30 miles North to South, within the counties of Surrey, Sussex and Kent.

History
The hunt was formed by the merger of three separate foxhound packs: the Old Surrey, the Burstow and the West Kent.

The first recorded pack on the Surrey country was in 1735 at Lovells Grove, Croydon, where the Earl of Onslow lived, and by 1800 a merchant pack was hunting the country. In 1808 is found the first evidence of the Old Surrey pack, based in Godstone, and retaining the merchant membership.

The Burstow pack dates from around 1866, having previously been a harrier pack.  Having been originally based at Poundhill, the pack moved to Felbridge in 1909.

In 1915, the Old Surrey and Burstow hunts amalgamated, and took the Felbridge base of the Burstow as their home.

The West Kent hunt dates back to 1776, and did not join with the Old Surrey and Burstow until 1999.

Hunt Country
The hunt covers three territories, as a result of the merger of the three former hunts, which gives the hunt a large country, although a large portion is not huntable due to urbanisation, roads and railway lines. The country runs from the M23 motorway in the west to Hadlow in the East, and from the Isle of Grain in the North to Fletching in the south.

The hunt's best centres are Edenbridge, Horsted Keynes, Penshurst and Mereworth.

Pony Club
The hunt is linked to branches of The Pony Club including an Old Surrey and Burstow Branch.

See also
List of fox hunts in the United Kingdom

References

External links
Old Surrey Burstow and West Kent Official Website
Obituary of Stan Luckhurst, The Daily Telegraph, 20 May, 2011

Sport in Sussex
Sport in Surrey
Sport in Kent
Fox hunts in the United Kingdom
Fox hunts in England